Harry Klock is a Republican member of the Montana Legislature. He was elected to House District 83 which represents a portion of the Lewis and Clark County area.

References

Living people
1948 births
Republican Party members of the Montana House of Representatives
Montana State University alumni